KWSU-TV (channel 10) is a PBS member television station licensed to Pullman, Washington, United States. The station is owned by Washington State University. KWSU-TV's studios are located in the Murrow Communications Center on WSU's main campus in Pullman, and its transmitter is located on Kamiak Butte near Palouse, Washington.

KWSU-TV's main signal serves a corner of the Spokane market as a "beta" station through the Program Differentiation Plan complementing KSPS-TV and Idaho Public Television. The station is carried on the Spokane DirecTV and Dish Network feeds, expanding its potential audience to over 600,000 people in Washington, Idaho, Oregon and Montana. KWSU-TV is also available on Xfinity systems in the Spokane area, and operates a translator on UHF channel 33 in Spokane.

KWSU-TV operates sister station KTNW (channel 31) in Richland, Washington, which serves as a full PBS member for the Tri-Cities area. Although this station maintains its own studios on the WSU Tri-Cities campus in Richland, master control and most internal operations are based at KWSU-TV's facilities.

Collectively branded as Northwest Public Broadcasting, the two stations cover southeastern Washington and north central Idaho as well as Wallowa County, Oregon.

History

KWSU signed on the air on September 24, 1962, as KWSC-TV (standing for Washington State College, the name of Washington State University until 1959), and changed its callsign to KWSU-TV in 1969, a year before the launch of PBS.

The station used the Washington State University cougar logo as its official logo until 1976.

KWSU signed on KTNW on channel 31 on October 18, 1987. The channel 31 allotment in the Tri-Cities was briefly used in the late 1950s by KTRX, based in Kennewick, Washington, and since that station signed off, channel 31 in the Tri-Cities has been vacant until KTNW signed on.

KWSU discontinued regular programming on its analog signal, over VHF channel 10, on February 17, 2009, the original date in which full-power television stations in the United States were to transition from analog to digital broadcasts under federal mandate (which was later pushed back to June 12, 2009). The station's digital signal relocated from its pre-transition UHF channel 17 to its analog-era VHF channel 10.

From 2017 to 2018, KWSU and KTNW used the nwptv branding. Since 2018, both stations have switched to the Northwest Public Broadcasting branding, which was a modified version of the Northwest Public Television branding used from 2006 to 2017.

Technical information

Subchannels
The station's digital signal is multiplexed:

KWSU offered ResearchChannel on subchannel 10.2 until that service was discontinued in August 2010.

Translators

See also
 KTNW
 Northwest Public Radio

References

External links

PBS member stations
Washington State University
Television channels and stations established in 1962
1962 establishments in Washington (state)
WSU-TV
Pullman, Washington